Program analysis may refer to:

 , the process of automatically analysing the behavior of computer programs
 Program evaluation, a disciplined way of assessing the merit, value, and worth of projects and programs
 Software performance analysis, the gathering of computer program performance characteristics at run time